Danby is a railway station on the Esk Valley Line, which runs between Middlesbrough and Whitby via Nunthorpe. It is owned by Network Rail and managed by Northern Trains.

History
The station was opened by the North Eastern Railway on 2 October 1865, following the opening of the route between Castleton and Grosmont. 

The station was host to a camping coach between 1936 and 1939. Camping coaches were holiday accommodation offered by many railway companies in the United Kingdom from the 1930s. The coaches were old passenger vehicles no longer suitable for use in trains, which were converted to provide sleeping and living space at static locations.

Danby is the location of the North York Moors National Park Visitors' Centre.

Services

As of the May 2021 timetable change, the station is served by five trains per day (four on Sunday) towards Whitby. Heading towards Middlesbrough via Nunthorpe, there are four trains per day. Most trains continue to Newcastle via Hartlepool. All services are operated by Northern Trains.

Rolling stock used: Class 156 Super Sprinter and Class 158 Express Sprinter

References

External links
 
 

Railway stations in the Borough of Scarborough
DfT Category F2 stations
Former North Eastern Railway (UK) stations
Railway stations in Great Britain opened in 1865
Northern franchise railway stations
1865 establishments in England